Plagiodera arizonae is a species of leaf beetles of the tribe Chrysomelini that can be found in Arizona. The species have black wings and red head and legs.

References

Chrysomelinae